Annika Bryn (born 1945) is a Swedish author and freelance journalist. Bryn has written several short stories in magazines and freelance articles in newspapers, as well as two crime fiction novels.

Bryn was born to a Swedish mother and a Norwegian father, active in the resistance against the German occupation of Norway in World War II. After divorce, the father moved to the United States and became a U.S. citizen.

Books 
 Den sjätte natten (The Sixth Night) 2003; thriller. Translated into Norwegian 2004 and German (Die sechste Nacht) 2005. First book in the series of leading protagonist Margareta Davidsson.
 Brottsplats Rosenbad (Crime Scene Rosenbad) Swedish, 2005. Rosenbad is the government building in Stockholm, Sweden. Second book in the series of Margareta Davidsson.
 Morden i Buttle (The Murders in Buttle), Swedish, 2006. Buttle is a small village on the island Gotland. Third book in the series of Margareta Davidsson.

1945 births
Living people
Swedish-language writers
Swedish thriller writers
Swedish women writers
Swedish women short story writers
Swedish short story writers
Swedish women novelists
Women thriller writers
Swedish people of Norwegian descent